K. L. Arya DAV Public School is a public, English medium, senior secondary co-educational school situated in Hisar city of Haryana, India. The school is run by Dayanand Anglo-Vedic Schools System. The school is one of the premiere institutes of the city and has given city toppers for many years especially in science streams. The school focuses on providing modern education and vedic knowledge at the same time.

History 
The school was established in 1983 when the first campus was built near Dayanand College in Hisar. The school is under the direct control of DAV College Managing Committee. In April 2008, a new wing was added, and the school was granted senior secondary affiliation from Central Board of Secondary Education. The new wing is located at a different campus.

The school was started in a small room with the purpose of providing affordable education. It soon got a good name in the city because of its quality education.

See also 

 List of schools in Hisar
 List of universities and colleges in Hisar
 List of institutions of higher education in Haryana

References 

Schools in Hisar (city)
Schools affiliated with the Arya Samaj

Universities and colleges affiliated with the Arya Samaj